Saleh Qeshlaqi (also Romanized as Şāleḩ Qeshlāqī; also known as Sālār Qeshlāq and Şāleḩ Qeshlāq) is a village in Gerdeh Rural District, in the Central District of Namin County, Ardabil Province, Iran. At the 2006 census, its population was 39, in 14 families.

References 

Towns and villages in Namin County